The ICRC Humanitarian Visa d'or Award has been awarded annually to a professional photojournalist who has covered a humanitarian issue related to an armed conflict since 2011. It is part of the annual Visa pour l’image international festival of photojournalism, which takes place in Perpignan, France.
From 2011 to 2015, the ICRC Humanitarian Visa d'or Award rewarded a photojournalist who had worked on the issue of violence against health care services in armed conflict. From 2015 to 2017, the competition focused on the situation of women in war: sexual violence, women in detention, women looking for missing family members, female fighters or also women becoming single heads of household. In 2018, the contest's theme changed to tackle the consequences of urban warfare on civilians.

History 

In 2011, the regional delegation of the International Committee of the Red Cross (ICRC) in France decided to create the “ICRC Humanitarian Visa d'or Award”, endowed with 8,000 euros. The aim: honor the work photojournalists carry out every day in the field, and above all, inform the most people possible of violations of international humanitarian law.

Awards winners

2020 
Theme: the consequences of urban warfare on civilians

The ICRC Humanitarian Visa Award was awarded to Alfredo Bosco, a freelance photographer and contributor to Luz Photo Agency in Milan. Geopolitical crises are the main focus of his work. He won the 10th edition of the ICRC Humanitarian Visa d’or Award with a report about drug war in the state of Guerrero (Mexico).

2019 
Theme: the consequences of urban warfare on civilians

Abdulmonam Eassa, Syrian photojournalist, born in 1995, now refugee in France, was rewarded for a report about the humanitarian consequences of the fighting in Eastern Ghouta in 2018. He started his career in photojournalism as a self-taught freelance photographer. He works with Agence France Presse.

2018 
Theme: the consequences of urban warfare on civilians

Véronique de Viguérie, French photojournalist was rewarded for her report “Heroines, war made”, which pays tribute to Yemeni women, surviving in urban areas, and who in the absence of men, act as heads of families or also nurses. She works with Getty Images and Verbatim Photo Agency, among others.

2017 
Theme: Women in war

Angela Ponce Romero, Peruvian photojournalist from the Diario Correo, was rewarded for her work entitled “Ayacucho” accomplished in Peru. "Ayacucho”, from the Quechua words “aya” meaning “corpse” and “cucho” meaning “corner,” is the “corner of the dead.” Her report covers commemorative events held in Ayacucho, in 2016 and 2017, with families still looking for their relatives gone missing during the civil war in the 80s.

2016 
Theme: Women in war

Juan Arredonde, Colombian-American photojournalist who often works with the New York Times and National Geographic, was rewarded for his photo essay “Born into Conflict: Child soldiers in Colombia”

2015 
Theme: Women in war

Diana Zeyneb Alhindawi, photojournalist for the New York Times, WSJ, Le Monde and Vice was rewarded in 2015 for her work entitled “Minova rape trials” shot in the Democratic Republic of Congo.

2014 
Theme: violence against health care services in armed conflict

The ICRC Humanitarian Visa Award was awarded to the National Geographic contributor, the French photojournalist William Daniels, for his work entitled “Humanitarian Crisis in the Central African Republic”

2013 
Theme: violence against health care services in armed conflict

Sebastiano Tomada (Piccolomini), American photojournalist, working with Getty Images, was rewarded for his report in Syria called « Life and Death in Aleppo ».

2012 
Theme: violence against health care services in armed conflict

The Franco-Algerian photojournalist and film-maker Mani was rewarded in 2012 for his work produced for the French Media Le Monde, for his report “Syria, inside Homs”

2011 
Theme: violence against health care services in armed conflict

The Spanish and French photographer Catalina Martin-Chicoo from Cosmos agency was the first winner of the ICRC Humanitarian Visa Award for her report “The First Square Kilometer of Freedom: Change Square, Sana’a, Yemen”

References 

Photography awards
2011 establishments in France
Awards established in 2011